Daniel Rudolf Marais (born 21 January 1992, in Bloemfontein) is a South African rugby union player for Yamaha Júbilo in the Top League in Japan. He usually plays as a centre, but can also play as a fly-half or fullback.

Career

Youth

Marais first represented the Free State in 2005, when he was part of their squad for the 2005 Under-13 Craven Week competition. He represented the  side (playing mainly as a fullback) in the Under-19 Provincial Championship competitions in 2010 and 2011, scoring 124 points in the latter competition to finish third in the scoring charts. He advanced to the  side, playing the majority of matches for them during the 2012 and 2013 seasons, with 2013 also seeing him starting to play mainly as a centre.

Free State Cheetahs

He made a total of six appearances during the competition.

He returned to Vodacom Cup action in 2014, captaining the side and scoring 41 points in his six starts.

Griquas

In May 2014, he joined  on a two-month deal for the duration of the 2014 Currie Cup qualification series.

References

South African rugby union players
Living people
1992 births
Rugby union players from Bloemfontein
Free State Cheetahs players
Rugby union centres
Griquas (rugby union) players
Cheetahs (rugby union) players
Shizuoka Blue Revs players
Stade Aurillacois Cantal Auvergne players
Pumas (Currie Cup) players